Syrniki or syrnyky (Ukrainian: сирники) are fried Eastern Slavic quark (curd cheese) pancakes. In Russia, they are also known as tvorozhniki (творо́жники). They are a part of Belarusian, Russian, Ukrainian, Latvian (biezpiena plācenīši), Lithuanian and Serbian cuisine. Their simplicity and delicious taste have made them very popular in Eastern Europe.

Etymology 
The name syrniki is derived from the Slavic word syr (сыр), stand for soft curd cheese. The Ukrainian language retains the old Slavic sense of the word, as in domashnii syr (домашній сир, literal translation 'domestic cheese'), whereas in Russian, another old Slavic word for curd cheese, namely the word tvorog (творог), is used.

Preparation 

Syrnyky or tvorozhniki are made from creamy tvorog, mixed with flour, eggs and sugar, sometimes adding vanilla extract. Pot cheese or farmer's cheese or Quark is suggested as a substitute for the tvorog. The soft mixture is shaped into cakes, which are pan- or shallow-fried in vegetable oil or in hot butter. The consistency should remain slightly creamy, while they are slightly browned on both sides. They are traditionally sweet and served for breakfast or dessert, but can be made savory as well. Raisins, chopped dried apricot, fresh apples or pears are sometimes added into the batter. They are typically served with varenye, jam, smetana (sour cream) and / or melted butter.

See also

 Quarkkäulchen
 Lazy varenyky
 Oladyi

References

External links

Michele A.Berdy's syrniki recipe  - Rossiyskaya Gazeta
Ukrainian Syrniki Recipe (Cheese Pancakes)
Syrniki (Russian cheese pancakes)
https://www.sainsburysmagazine.co.uk/recipes/breakfasts/syrniki
Syrniki (Curd-Cheese Pancakes)

Belarusian desserts
Russian desserts
Cheese dishes
Desserts
Pancakes
Ukrainian desserts